Lǚ Lìpíng (born 3 April 1960) is a Chinese actress.

Her career accolades include one Golden Rooster Award, Flying Apsaras Award, Golden Horse Award and Golden Phoenix Award, two Hundred Flowers Awards, Golden Eagle Awards and Chinese Film Media Awards, and she has won the 6th Tokyo International Film Festival - Best Actress, 1st Singapore International Film Festival - Best Actress and 13th Shanghai International Film Festival - Best Actress.

Biography
Lü was born in Beijing on April 3, 1960. After graduating from Central Academy of Drama in 1984 she was assigned to Shanghai Film Studio as an actress.

Personal life
She has married three times. She married her first husband, actor Zhang Fengyi, in 1988, with whom she had a son, Zhang Boyu. The couple divorced in 1991.

She married for the second time on January 16, 1999, in Los Angeles, to Tao Wei, a Chinese footballer. They divorced in 2001.

She married actor Sun Haiying in 2002 in Shenyang, Liaoning.

Filmography

Film

Television

Awards

References

External links
 
 
 
 

1960 births
Central Academy of Drama alumni
Chinese television actresses
Chinese film actresses
Living people
Actresses from Beijing